Lake Evans is a freshwater lake in the municipality of Eeyou Istchee James Bay, in the administrative region of Nord-du-Québec, in western Quebec, Canada. This lake is crossed by the Broadback River.

Geography 

Surrounded by a generally flat lands including marshes, Lake Evans is located 130 km south-east of James Bay. It receives the waters of the "Lake Le Gardeur" (adjacent to the east side) through the Théodat River and Lake Dana (west side neighbor) through Pastukamau pass. Lake Evans is the largest expansion of the Broadback River.

Lake Evans has deep bays that give it an irregular contour. Areas surrounding the lake have a generally flat topography, with several marshes, except for the area south of the lake where culminate the Reid and Middleton Mountains.

For canoeists, lake is renowned by the difficult portage over Longue Pointe peninsula.

Toponymy 

The designation "Evans Lake" has been in use in the late nineteenth century. This lake has been explored and described by geologist Robert Bell and O'Sullivan Surveyor in 1900 and 1901. The name of the river evokes life work of Sir John Evans (1823-1908), archaeologist, geologist and paper manufacturer, an influential member of several learned societies. Evans held the positions of Treasurer of the "Royal Society" from 1878 to 1898, President of the "Numismatic Society" from 1872 to 1908 and president of the "Society of Antiquaries" London in 1885. Evans also is the author in numismatic field of books now considered classics, and in the tools and weapons of prehistoric populations of Britain.

Long ago, this lake was designated "Long Lake" or "Lac Turgeon." Initially, the name of this body of water would have been awarded around 1910. The place name Lake Evans was formalized on December 5, 1968, at the Commission de toponymie du Québec.

See also 
 Broadback River
 Rupert Bay
 Eeyou Istchee James Bay
 List of lakes of Canada

References 

Lakes of Nord-du-Québec